Brown Marsh Township, population 1,865, is one of fifteen townships in Bladen County, North Carolina. The Town of Clarkton, North Carolina is within Brown Marsh Township.

Geography
Brown Marsh Township is drained by Brown Marsh Swamp and a tributary, Bigfoot Swamp.  All of these streams are part of the larger Waccamaw River drainage.

References

Townships in Bladen County, North Carolina
Townships in North Carolina